Cat Island is a small island lying south of Rodrigues in the Indian Ocean.  It is surrounded by a coral reef and is known for diving and snorkelling sites.

Geography of Rodrigues